Horalabiosa  is a disputed genus of cyprinid fish found only in India.  There are currently three described species in this genus, although it is usually regarded as a synonym of Garra.

Species
 Horalabiosa arunachalami J. A. Johnson & Soranam, 2001
 Horalabiosa joshuai Silas, 1954
 Horalabiosa palaniensis Rema Devi & Menon, 1994

References

 

Cyprinidae genera
Cyprinid fish of Asia
Fish of India